Dexter Regional High School is a public high school in Dexter, Maine, United States. During the 2012–13 school year, DRHS had approx. 300 enrolled students. In 2002, the school had a graduation rate of 81.52%, below the state's rate of 86.71%. In 2003, the graduation rate was 76.84%, below the state average of 87.57%.

Notable alumni
Jere Abbott, founding associate director of the Museum of Modern Art

References

Public high schools in Maine
Schools in Penobscot County, Maine